The following is a list of museum ships of the United States military, specifically the United States Navy and the United States Coast Guard. It represents a subset of the list of museum ships comprising museum ships located worldwide.


See also
 List of museum ships
 List of current ships of the United States Navy
 Equipment of the United States Coast Guard
 List of submarine museums

References

Ships of the United States Navy
History of the United States Navy
Ships of the United States Coast Guard
Ships